Harlow's Casino Resort & Hotel is a casino located in Refuge, Mississippi near Greenville, and approximately  east of the Mississippi River. It is owned and operated by Churchill Downs Inc. Harlow's has  of gaming space with slot machines, blackjack, craps, and a 7-table poker room, a 105-room hotel, a 2,500-seat entertainment center, two restaurants, and three bars.

Originally the name of the casino was going to be Bali-Hai, but the owner, the late Rick Schilling, changed the name to Harlow's Casino Resort "to bring back that lavish old Hollywood style with even more grandeur to this new property". The casino is designed to reflect the era known as the Golden Age of Hollywood. One of the two restaurants came from the Splash Casino, which was docked at Mhoon Landing in Tunica County, Mississippi, and is now a 400-seat buffet dining area called Legends.

Churchill Downs purchased the property in December 2010 for $138 million.

See also
List of casinos in Mississippi

References

External links

Casinos in Mississippi
Hotels in Mississippi
Tourist attractions in Washington County, Mississippi
Buildings and structures in Washington County, Mississippi
Churchill Downs Incorporated
Casino hotels
Casinos completed in 2007
Hotel buildings completed in 2007
2007 establishments in Mississippi